Regents Center is an arena located on the campus of Luther College in Decorah, Iowa.  The arena is home to the Luther College Norse men's basketball, women's basketball, volleyball and wrestling teams. During inclement weather, Luther's commencement ceremonies are held in the arena.

History
The arena was completed in 1964 as a replacement for the C.K. Preus Gymnasium, which was destroyed by fire in 1961.  The arena was originally known as The Fieldhouse. In addition to athletics, the arena was the home of Luther's music ensemble concerts until the completion of the Center for Faith and Life in 1978.  Through 2001, Luther's performance of Handel's Messiah was held in the arena.

An addition featuring new facilities for indoor track and other sports was completed in 1991, when the building was renamed the Regents Center. Another addition, the Legends Fitness for Life Center, was completed in 2001.

External links
 Luther College Regents Center page
 Luther College Regents Center athletics page
 Luther Norse

College basketball venues in the United States
1964 establishments in Iowa
Sports venues completed in 1964
Basketball venues in Iowa
College volleyball venues in the United States
College wrestling venues in the United States